Samsung Internet Browser (or simply Samsung Internet or S Browser) is a mobile web browser for smartphones and tablets developed by Samsung Electronics. It is based on the open-source Chromium project. It comes pre-installed on Samsung Galaxy devices. Since 2015, it has been available for download from Google Play, and recently it is also available for their Tizen-based smartwatch via the Samsung Galaxy Store. Samsung estimated that it had around 400 million monthly active users in 2016. According to StatCounter, it had a market share of around 5.06% (among 69.37% for all Chrome variants) in January 2023.

Most of the code differences to the standard Chromium code base were introduced in order to support Samsung-specific hardware, such as Gear VR and biometric sensors.

History 
Samsung Internet replaced the stock Android browser as the default on Samsung Galaxy devices in 2012. Around early 2013, it was decided to base the browser on Chromium, and the first Chromium-based version was shipped with an S4 model later that year.

Support 
The later version (v6.2) of Samsung Internet for Android supports all Android 5.0 and above phones.

Previously, (v5.0) Samsung Internet for Android was only supported on Samsung Galaxy and Google Nexus phones with Android 5.0 and above.

Features 
 Content blocking extensions
 Gear VR and DeX integration
 KNOX Support
 Tabbed browsing with up to 99 tabs, where opening the 100th tab closes the earliest tab.
 Bookmark Synchronization
 Ad Blocking
 Reading Mode
 Saved Pages
 "Secret mode" and biometric authentication (unavailable in Knox-tripped devices, which is disabled by eFuse hardware upon unlocking the bootloader)
 Secure Web Auto Login
 SPen features
 Find on pages
 Support for service workers and Push API
 Dark Mode
 Customize Menu
 Video Assistant 
 QR code scanner
 Smart anti tracking

The Saved Pages feature has been criticized for lack of data portability, due to the pages being stored in a locked directory from which they can not be exported and backed up by the user.

References

External links 
 Samsung Internet Developer hub

2013 software
Android web browsers
Samsung Galaxy
Samsung software
Software based on WebKit